Ezzelino II da Romano, also known as Ezzelino il Monaco ("Ezzelino the Monk"; died 1235) was an Italian nobleman of the Ezzelini family, who was lord of Onara (until 1199),  Romano, Bassano and Godego.

Biography
The son of Ezzelino I, in 1182 he fought for lands belonging to the monks of a monastery in Sesto al Reghena. On 24 April 1198 Pope Innocent III asked Pellegrinus II, Patriarch of Aquileia, to resolve the matter and to raise the excommunication which Ezzelino had received from the patriarch of Grado.

In 1191-1193 Ezzelino was podestà of Treviso, and later of Verona (1200). Ezzelino raised an army to expel Azzo VI of Este after the latter became podestà of Verona in 1207.

In 1199 his castle at Onara was destroyed by the Paduans after Ezzelino had signed a separate peace with Vicenza; he therefore moved the family residence to Romano, by which name his family would be known in the following decades. In 1209-1210 he was among the followers of emperor Otto IV, who gave him possession of  Bassano (1211). Ezzelino II became podestà of Vicenza in 1211. 

In 1212 Ezzelino II clashed near Verona with the troops of the Lombard League; the latter was defeated and its commander, Azzo VI d'Este, perished. In 1213 he fought with Padua against the Estensi and, the following year, against the Venetians.

In 1221 Ezzelino retreated into a monastery at Oliero in Valstagna and then at Campese, hence his surname of Monaco ("monk"), leaving the administration of the fiefs to his sons Ezzelino and Alberico da Romano. His daughter Cunizza da Romano was married to Riccardo di San Bonifacio, lord of Verona.

He died in the monastery of Campese in 1235.

References

Sources
 

12th-century births
1235 deaths
Ezzelino 02
Nobility from Veneto
People excommunicated by the Catholic Church
13th-century condottieri
Wars of the Guelphs and Ghibellines